The Kalki Purana (IAST: Kalki purāṇa) is a Vaishnavism-tradition Hindu text about the tenth avatar of Vishnu named Kalki. The Sanskrit text was likely composed in Bengal during an era when the region was being ruled by the Bengal Sultanate or the Mughal Empire. Wendy Doniger dates it to sometime between 1500 CE and 1700 CE. It has a floruit of 1726 CE based on a manuscript discovered in Dhaka, Bangladesh.

Structure

It is not one of the 18 Maha-Puranas (great Puranas), and is counted as an Upapurana or secondary Purana. The extant text exists in many versions, which vary in structure and details. Some do not divide the text into sections and have about 35 chapters. One manuscript comprises three aṃśas (sections) consisting 7 and 21 chapters respectively.

Content

Family lineage of Kali 
The beginning of the Kalki Purana describes Kali's lineage starting with Brahma, his great-great-grandfather, and ending with the birth of his children's children. Instead of being born of poison from the churning of the ocean of milk according to other Hindu texts, he is the product of a long line of incestuous monsters born from Brahma's back. Kali is the great-great-grandson of Lord Brahma. He is the son of Krodha (Anger) and his sister-turned-wife Himsa (Violence). He is the grandson of Dambha (Vanity) and his sister Maya (Illusion). He is the great-grandson of Adharma (Impropriety) and his wife, Mithya (Falsehood). Adharma was originally created from Lord Brahma's back as a Maleen Pataka (a very dark and deadly sinful object). Kali and his family were created by Brahma to hurry the dissolution of the cosmos after the pralaya period was over. When his family takes human form on earth, they further taint the hearts and minds of mankind to bring about the end of Dvapara Yuga and the beginning of Kali Yuga. During the first stage of Kali Yuga, the varnashrama breaks down and God-worship is forsaken by man. All through the second, third, and fourth stages, man forgets the name of god and no longer offers Yajna (offerings) to the Devas.

Manifestation of Kalki on Earth 
Brahma and the devas approach Vishnu for protection from the evils of the Kali-yuga. After listening to accounts of violence and injustice occurring in the universe, Vishnu promises to be born as Kalki in the family of Sumati and Vishnuyasha, in a village called Shambala, on the twelfth day during the fortnight of the waxing moon. At a young age, he is taught all the holy scriptures, including about Dharma, Karma, Artha, Knowledge of the most ancient, the necessary wisdom of social perspective and military training under the care of the immortal Parashurama (the sixth incarnation of Vishnu). Soon, Kalki worships Shiva, who gets pleased by the devotion and gives him gifts; a divine white horse named Devadatta (A Manifestation Of Garuda), a sharp, powerful, strong sword, where it’s handle is bedecked with jewels and a parrot named Shuka, who is an all-knower; the past, the present and the future, while other gifts (armour, knowledge, powers etc) are too given to him by other Devas, Devis, Saints And Righteous Kings. Kalki then marries princess Padmavati (Reincarnation Of Lakshmi), the daughter of King Vrihadrath and Queen Kaumudi of Simhala (The Island Of The Lion) and princess Ramaa, the daughter of King Shashidhwaja and Queen Sushanta. He fights in many wars, ends evil including Kali and his entire family blood line, which wiped out by the avatar's generals and he presumably dies from wounds inflicted by Dharma and Satya Yuga personified. Kalki, meanwhile, battles and simultaneously kills the demon's most powerful generals, Koka and Vikoka, twin devils adept in the dark arts. Kalki then returns to Shambhala (his homeland) to rule, inaugurates a new Yuga for the good and divides the earth among his generals. Sumati and Vishnuyasha, his parents, will then travel to the holy place of Badrikashram, where they will live. Kalki then leaves the earth to go to Vaikuntha as his dharma (duty) is completed.

Origin
Kalki Purana is a relatively recent text, likely composed in Bengal. Its dating terminus ante quem is the 18th-century. It is likely Bengal because its earliest manuscripts have been found in Bengal, and these are Sanskrit written in Bengali script, states the historian Sumit Sarkar. The colophons of these manuscripts places them in the 18th-century. According to the Indologist Wendy Doniger, the Kalki Purana is broadly dated by scholars between 1500 and 1700 CE, though these earlier dates are conjectures and no manuscripts from or before the 17th-century are known.

Significance 
According to Edwin Bernbaum, the Kalki Purana is a Hindu version of Shambala and its mythology has many features found in the Buddhist counterpart. Other scholars such as John Newman state that Buddhists borrowed the Hindu concept of Kalki and adapted the concept in the text Kalachakra Tantra. They combined their idea of Shambhala with Kalki to reflect the theo-political situation they faced after the arrival of Islam in Central Asia and western Tibet. The Buddhist texts also mention a king named Kalki from Shambhala who leads an army to destroy the Muslim persecutors of dhamma; then after the victory of good over evil and attainment of religious freedoms, Kalki ushers in a new era. The Buddhist text is dated to about the 10th-century. While the Kalachakra Tantra likely borrowed the Kalki concept, the Kalki Purana post dates the Kalachakra Tantra. The much later era Buddhist text Vimalaprabha, which comments on Kalachakra Tantra, also mentions Kalki and provides details not found in Kalki Purana such as the Shambala being north of River Shita. According to John Newman, this river is also called Tarim River in central Asia (east Turkistan).

See also 
Ramayana
Mahabharata

References

Bibliography 

 Himanshu Aneria, Kalki Purana,  Fusion Books (1969)

External links 

 

Puranas
Hindu eschatology